Mrač is a municipality and village in Benešov District in the Central Bohemian Region of the Czech Republic. It has about 800 inhabitants.

Geography
Mrač is located in the Benešov Uplands. The Benešovský Stream flows through the municipality.

Gallery

References

Villages in Benešov District